Duje Medak (born 19 December 1993) is a Croatian professional football midfielder who plays for Metković.

Club career
Medak joined Bosnian side GOŠK Gabela in January 2019.
On 26 July 2019 Neretvanac Opuzen confirmed, that Medak had returned to the club. In February 2021, Medak moved to ONK Metković.
February 2023</ref> NK Neretvanac

References

External links
 
 Duje Medak at Sportnet.hr 

1993 births
Living people
Sportspeople from Metković
Association football midfielders
Croatian footballers
HNK Hajduk Split players
NK Primorac 1929 players
NK Inter Zaprešić players
NK Solin players
NK Neretva players
FK Poprad players
NK GOŠK Gabela players
Croatian Football League players
First Football League (Croatia) players
2. Liga (Slovakia) players
Premier League of Bosnia and Herzegovina players
Croatian expatriate footballers
Expatriate footballers in Slovakia
Croatian expatriate sportspeople in Slovakia
Expatriate footballers in Bosnia and Herzegovina
Croatian expatriate sportspeople in Bosnia and Herzegovina